The 2004–05 National Division Three North was the fifth season (seventeenth overall) of the fourth division (north) of the English domestic rugby union competition using the name National Division Three North.  New teams to the division included Rugby Lions who were relegated from the 2003–04 National Division Two while Bedford Athletic were promoted as champions of Midlands Division 1 along with Bradford & Bingley (champions) and Cleckheaton (playoffs) who both came up from North Division 1.  The season would also see the introduction of a new points system with 4 points being awarded for a win, 2 points being awarded for a draw (replacing the old system of 2 points for a win and 1 for a draw) with the addition of a bonus point being given for scoring 4 or more tries as well as a bonus point given if you manage to lose a game within 7 points of the victorious team.  In terms of promotion the league champions would go straight up into National Division Two while the runners up would have a one-game playoff against the runners up from National Division Three South (at the home ground of the club with the superior league record) for the final promotion place. 

Halifax would finish as runaway champions of the league, ending up 14 points clear of nearest rivals Macclesfield (even with a cancelled game against Blaydon) and gaining promotion to the 2005–06 National Division Two.  Runners up Macclesfield would fail to join Halifax as they lost their playoff game away to 2004–05 National Division Three South runners up Redruth in the north-south playoff in front of a huge crowd of 4,000 at the Recreation Ground.  Although Halifax won the league with plenty to spare the rest of the division was fairly closely contested with only 3 wins separating 4th placed Fylde from 12th placed Rugby Lions.  In terms of relegation newly promoted Bedford Athletic went down first followed by Dudley Kingswinford.  The final spot was taken by Rugby Lions suffering their third successive relegation.  Rugby Lions would actually have stayed up had in not been for a five-point penalty given for them fielding too many foreign players in a home game against Bedford Athletic.  All three relegated teams would drop down to Midlands Division 1 for the following season.  Although Rugby Lions were punished from fielding too many overseas players, other teams benefited immensely from their foreign contingent (particularly Halifax and Bradford & Bingley) with six of the top ten try scorers hailing from outside England.

Participating teams and locations

Final league table

Results

Round 1

Round 2

Round 3 

Postponed.  Game rescheduled to 12 February 2005.

Round 4

Round 5

Round 6

Round 7 

Postponed.  Game rescheduled to 12 February 2005.

Postponed.  Game rescheduled to 26 March 2005.

Round 8

Round 9 

Postponed.  Game rescheduled to 12 February 2005.

Postponed.  Game rescheduled to 26 March 2005.

Round 10

Round 11

Round 12

Round 13

Round 14 

Postponed.  Game rescheduled to 16 April 2005.

Postponed.  Game rescheduled to 16 April 2005.

Postponed.  Game rescheduled to 16 April 2005.

Postponed.  Game rescheduled to 26 March 2005.

Round 15

Round 16

Round 17

Round 18

Rounds 3, 7 & 9 (rescheduled games) 

Game rescheduled from 6 November 2004.

Game rescheduled from 20 November 2004.

Game rescheduled from 25 September 2004.

Round 19

Round 20 

Postponed.  Game rescheduled to 26 February 2005.

Postponed.  Game rescheduled to 26 February 2005.

Round 21 

Game would initially be postponed but due to fixture congestion was ultimately cancelled as the result would not have any impact on final league standings.

Round 22

Round 23

Rounds 7, 9 & 14 (rescheduled games) 

Game rescheduled from 20 November 2004.

Game rescheduled from 6 November 2004.

Game rescheduled from 8 January 2005.

Round 24

Round 25

Round 14 (rescheduled games) 

Game rescheduled from 8 January 2005.

Game rescheduled from 8 January 2005.

Game rescheduled from 8 January 2005.

Round 26

Round 20 (rescheduled games) 

Game rescheduled from 26 February 2005.

Game rescheduled from 26 February 2005.

Promotion play-off
The league runners up of National Division Three South and North would meet in a playoff game for promotion to National Division Two.  Redruth were the southern division runners up and as they had a superior league record than northern runners-up, Macclesfield, they hosted the play-off match.

Total season attendances

Individual statistics 

 Note that points scorers includes tries as well as conversions, penalties and drop goals.

Top points scorers

Top try scorers

Season records

Team
Largest home win — 70 pts
77 - 7 Bradford & Bingley at home to Dudley Kingswinford on 27 November 2004
Largest away win — 33 pts
36 - 3 Rugby Lions away to Dudley Kingswinford on 11 September 2004
Most points scored — 77 pts
77 - 7 Bradford & Bingley at home to Dudley Kingswinford on 27 November 2004
Most tries in a match — 10
Bradford & Bingley at home to Dudley Kingswinford on 27 November 2004
Most conversions in a match — 9
Bradford & Bingley at home to Dudley Kingswinford on 27 November 2004
Most penalties in a match — 6
Halifax away to Bradford & Bingley on 16 April 2005
Most drop goals in a match — 2 (x5)
Bradford & Bingley at home to New Brighton on 30 October 2004
Macclesfield at home to Halifax on 13 November 2004
Bradford & Bingley at home to Macclesfield on 11 December 2004
Macclesfield away to Dudley Kingswinford on 6 November 2004
Tynedale at home to Bradford & Bingley on 2 April 2005

Player
Most points in a match — 27
 Tom Rhodes for Bradford & Bingley at home to Dudley Kingswinford on 27 November 2004
Most tries in a match — 4
 Simon Mulholland for Kendal at home to Darlington on 11 December 2004
Most conversions in a match — 9
 Tom Rhodes for Bradford & Bingley at home to Dudley Kingswinford on 27 November 2004
Most penalties in a match — 6
 Douglas Sanft for Halifax away to Bradford & Bingley on 16 April 2005
Most drop goals in a match — 2 
 Tom Rhodes for Bradford & Bingley at home to New Brighton on 30 October 2004
 Michael Newell for Macclesfield at home to Halifax on 13 November 2004
 Tom Rhodes for Bradford & Bingley at home to Macclesfield on 11 December 2004
 Michael Newell for Macclesfield away to Dudley Kingswinford on 6 November 2004
 Gavin Beasley for Tynedale at home to Bradford & Bingley on 2 April 2005

Attendances
Highest — 700 (x2)
Cleckheaton at home to Halifax on 22 January 2005 
Bradford & Bingley at home to Halifax on 16 April 2005
Lowest — 70  
Blaydon at home to Kendal on 4 December 2004
Highest Average Attendance — 458
Halifax
Lowest Average Attendance — 177
Blaydon

See also
 English Rugby Union Leagues
 English rugby union system
 Rugby union in England

References

External links
 NCA Rugby

2004–05
2004–05 in English rugby union leagues